Pedro Miguel Pinotes (born 30 September 1989) is an Angolan swimmer who competes in the Men's 400m individual medley. At the 2012 Summer Olympics he finished 30th overall in the heats in the Men's 400 metre individual medley and failed to reach the semi-final. At the 2016 Summer Olympics in Rio de Janeiro, he competed in the men's 400 m individual medley. He finished 25th in the heats and did not advance to the semi-final.

References

External links
 

Angolan male swimmers
1989 births
Living people
Olympic swimmers of Angola
Swimmers at the 2012 Summer Olympics
Swimmers at the 2016 Summer Olympics
Male medley swimmers
African Games silver medalists for Angola
African Games medalists in swimming
Competitors at the 2011 All-Africa Games
Swimmers at the 2015 African Games
Sportspeople from Luanda